Davinia Vanmechelen (born 30 August 1999) is a Belgian footballer. She plays as a forward for Club YLA and the Belgium women's national football team.

Career statistics

International

References

External links
 
 
 
 Davinia Vanmechelen at Soccerdonna.de 
 
 Davinia Vanmechelen at Club YLA
 

1999 births
Living people
Belgian women's footballers
Belgium women's international footballers
Standard Liège (women) players
Women's association football forwards
Paris Saint-Germain Féminine players
KRC Genk Ladies players
PSV (women) players
Expatriate women's footballers in France
Expatriate women's footballers in the Netherlands
Belgian expatriate sportspeople in France
Belgian expatriate sportspeople in the Netherlands
Belgian expatriate women's footballers
Division 1 Féminine players
Eredivisie (women) players
Super League Vrouwenvoetbal players
People from Sint-Truiden
Footballers from Limburg (Belgium)
UEFA Women's Euro 2022 players
Belgium women's youth international footballers
Club Brugge KV (women) players
UEFA Women's Euro 2017 players